Expectations is the debut major label studio album by American singer and actress Hayley Kiyoko, released on March 30, 2018. The album title was announced along with its cover on January 1, 2018 through social media. The album was preceded by the singles "Sleepover", "Feelings" and "Curious". Expectations garnered mostly positive reviews from music critics. The album debuted within the top 40 of record charts in Ireland, New Zealand, United Kingdom and United States.

Singles
Expectations was preceded by the release of three singles, as well as one promotional single. The first single called "Sleepover" was released on March 2, 2017 along its music video, directed by Kiyoko herself, via BuzzFeed. The second single, "Feelings" was released on October 19, 2017 along its self-directed music video. "Curious" was released as the third single on January 11, 2018, with the pre-order of the album and, as the previous singles, along its music video, directed by Kiyoko herself and James Larese. It premiered via Total Request Live. "Curious" additionally became Kiyoko's first single to chart, peaking at no. 40 on the US Mainstream Top 40 and no. 37 on the US Dance/Mix Show Airplay chart. "Let It Be" was released as a promotional single on March 16, 2018.

Critical reception 

Expectations received generally positive reviews from music critics. Laura Snapes, writing for Pitchfork, gave the album a 6 out of 10 rating. She defines the album's best moments as those "trading in specificity rather than generic neediness, representing an experience that rarely finds an outlet in pop." She also, however, criticized the songwriting on the album, stating "it lacks that kind of songwriting consistency." Snapes concludes her review by writing, "Kiyoko’s debut won’t blow past anyone’s expectations, but it contains just enough intrigue and individuality to sustain them for a second shot." Neil Z. Yeung of AllMusic wrote, "sometimes, Expectations can be generic, like on "Sleepover" and "He'll Never Love You," [...] However, despite this occasional dip into indistinguishable pop territory, Kiyoko's debut hints at untapped potential from a fresh voice with a relatable perspective." Emily Mackay of The Guardian reacted more positively, calling the album "sparklingly refreshing" and felt the album's ability to "[stay] true to idiosyncratic instinct has made Expectations feel more universal than a generic, play-it-safe debut." Mackay rated the album four stars out of five.

Lauren Mullineaux, writing for The 405, rated the album 8 out of 10, praising the album's LGBT themes. She noted Kiyoko as "the first unabashedly queer female normalising this in the mainstream on such a transparent, visible level; through her lyrics and her videos." Mullineaux was also complimentary towards the album's "polished" production, as well as listing "Mercy/Gatekeeper", "Molecules", and "He'll Never Love You (HNLY)" as album highlights. Sydney Gore of MTV described the album as "a full range of life experiences covered within these 13 tracks, marking the first chapter of an ongoing story that Hayley finally feels comfortable in sharing with the world." Glenn Gamboa of Newsday.com praised the album, writing that "For Kiyoko, “Expectations” couldn't be higher, but the music is so good she seems set to surpass even the loftiest ones."

Track listing
Credits adapted from Tidal and Allmusic.

Charts

References

2018 debut albums
Atlantic Records albums
Empire Distribution albums
Hayley Kiyoko albums
LGBT-related albums